Kamaluddin Azfar is a politician from Sindh, Pakistan. He was Finance Minister and later Governor of Sindh. Kamal Azfar was elected as a member of Pakistan Peoples Party.

References

Governors of Sindh
Living people
Year of birth missing (living people)